Roman Lyuduchin (born May 4, 1988) is a Russian professional ice hockey forward. He is currently a free agent having last played for High1 of Asia League Ice Hockey (ALIH).

Lyduchin previously played in the Kontinental Hockey League for HC Spartak Moscow, Lokomotiv Yaroslavl, HC Neftekhimik Nizhnekamsk, HC Sochi and HC Yugra. He joined High1 of Asia League Ice Hockey in 2018 and spent one season with the team but became a free agent at the conclusion of the season after High1 were not included in the Asia League's team lineup for the 2019-20 season.

References

External links

1988 births
Living people
Dizel Penza players
High1 players
Lokomotiv Yaroslavl players
Molot-Prikamye Perm players
HC Neftekhimik Nizhnekamsk players
Russian ice hockey right wingers
HC Sochi players
HC Spartak Moscow players
Torpedo Nizhny Novgorod players